Alexandra Lowe Riley (born 30 October 1987) is an American-born New Zealand professional footballer who plays as a defender for Angel City of the American National Women's Soccer League (NWSL), as well as the New Zealand women's national football team. She captains both her club and national teams. As a collegiate athlete, she captained the Stanford soccer team to two NCAA semi-finals and one final.

Early life
Born in Los Angeles, California to parents John Graham Riley and Beverly Fong Lowe, Ali attended St. Matthew's Parish School in Pacific Palisades and Harvard-Westlake School in North Hollywood, California. She was named captain of the soccer team during her senior season and was a two-time Mission League Offensive MVP as well as a two-time first-team San Fernando Valley selection. As a senior, she helped lead the Wolverines to the 2006 Southern Section Division I final and was named to the All-CIF Southern Section Division I first team. Riley also competed for local soccer clubs, LA Breakers FC (formerly Westside Breakers) and Real SoCal (formerly SoCal United).

Stanford University
Riley attended Stanford University and played for the Stanford Cardinal from 2006 to 2009. During her freshman year, she started in fifteen of the eighteen matches she played.  She played forward and scored four goals with two assists. As a sophomore, she played sixteen games and started in fourteen of them.  She scored two goals and had two assists. During her junior year, Riley converted from her position at forward to an outside back and she has played almost exclusively at left or right full-back ever since, As a senior, Riley started in each of the twenty-four games and scored one goal with one assist.

Club career

FC Gold Pride
In January 2010, Riley was selected as the tenth pick in the first round of the 2010 WPS Draft by FC Gold Pride. While she played on her natural right wing-back position for the NZ Women's National Team, she played professionally as a left wing-back and had three assists in the 2010 run to the WPS championship by FC Gold Pride. Riley won the WPS Rookie of the Year award.

Western New York Flash
Riley signed for Western New York Flash for the 2011 season becoming a free agent after FC Gold Pride failed to find financial backers.

In the 2011 season Riley was a finalist for Defender of the year as the Flash swept both the league season title and then won the 2011 WPS Championship.

In 2012, Riley re-signed with Western New York Flash for the 2012 season, however, the league folded before play began.

LdB FC Malmö/FC Rosengård
With the suspension of the WPS, she signed in 2012 with LdB FC Malmö, 2011 Swedish League Champions. In her first game, (the Super Cupen) she assisted on the winning goal. She played her first full season in the Damallsvenskan in 2013. With  LdB FC Malmö she finished top of the table.

In September 2013 Riley re-signed with LdB FC Malmö (since December 2013 renamed FC Rosengård) for the 2014 and 2015 seasons. FC Rosengård again won gold in the Damallsvenskan.

In March 2015 she played both at full-back and forward in her second Super Cupen victory with Rosengård. In September 2015 she re-signed with Rosengård. The team went on to win the Damallsvenskan for the third straight year earning Riley earned her fifth league championship in her eight-year career.

Chelsea
On 26 June 2018, it was announced that Riley would be leaving Rosengård in July to join Chelsea in the English FA Women's Super League.

Bayern Munich
On 18 July 2019, Riley moved to Bayern Munich of the Frauen-Bundesliga.

Orlando Pride
On 10 February 2020, Ali Riley returned to the US and signed a one-year contract with an option for an additional year for the Orlando Pride. The season was postponed due to the coronavirus pandemic with the NWSL eventually scheduling a smaller schedule 2020 NWSL Challenge Cup tournament. However, on 22 June 2020, the team withdrew from the tournament following positive COVID-19 tests among both players and staff.

Loan to FC Rosengård
On 13 July 2020, having been unable to feature for the Pride, Riley returned to Sweden to be with her partner during the pandemic and rejoined Rosengård on loan.

Angel City FC
On 27 January 2022, Riley was traded to Angel City FC in exchange for $15,000 in allocation money and a third-round pick in the 2023 NWSL Draft. As a result of the trade, she was able to play in her hometown for the first time in her career.

International career

Riley represented New Zealand at the 2006 Women's U-20 World Cup finals. She made her senior debut in a 0–5 loss to Australia on 6 February 2007, and represented New Zealand at the 2007 FIFA Women's World Cup finals in China, where they lost to Brazil 0–5, Denmark (0–2) and China (0–2).

Riley also played every minute for the New Zealand squad in the 2008 Summer Olympics where they drew with Japan (2–2) before losing to Norway (0–1) and the United States (0–4).
Riley's first international goal was scored in the final of the OFC Women's Nations Cup as New Zealand qualified for the 2011 FIFA Women's World Cup with an 11–0 win over Papua New Guinea.

On 27 June 2011, Riley earned her 50th A-international cap in a 2–1 loss to Japan in New Zealand's opening group stage match at the 2011 FIFA Women's World Cup. In the final seconds of extra time in the match v. Mexico she assisted on the tying goal that gave the Football Ferns their first point in a World Cup final.

In the 2012 Olympics Riley played every minute of the Football Ferns' four games. In the preliminary round games the Ferns lost 0–1 to Great Britain and Brazil and beat Cameroon 3–1. This was the first victory by a NZ football team in the Olympics. With the victory the Ferns advanced to the second round based on goal differential. In the quarter-final the Ferns played the USA losing 0–2.

In 2013 Riley started for New Zealand in a series of games establishing the Football Ferns as a growing force in international competition. The Ferns won the Vallais Cup beating #4 Brazil 1–0 and #16 China 4–0 and also had ties playing #10 Australia, #3 Japan and #1 USA.

She featured in all New Zealand's three matches at the 2015 FIFA Women's World Cup in Canada.

In the 2016 Rio Olympics Riley played every minute of the Football Ferns' three games. The Ferns lost 0–2 to USA, 0–3 to France and beat Colombia 1–0.

Riley has been the captain of the Football Ferns since the 2017 Cyprus Cup.

In April 2019, Riley was named to the final 23-player squad for the 2019 FIFA Women's World Cup.

Media 

Riley hosts a Off the Ball show for sports website Just Women's Sports since 2021.

Career statistics

Club 
.

International goals 
 New Zealand score listed first, score column indicates score after each Riley goal.

Honours

Club
FC Gold Pride
 Women's Professional Soccer (1): 2010

Western New York Flash
 Women's Professional Soccer (1): 2011

FC Rosengård (formerly LdB FC Malmö)
 Damallsvenskan (3): 2013, 2014, 2015
 Svenska Supercupen (3): 2012, 2015, 2016
 Svenska Cupen (3): 2016, 2017, 2018

International
New Zealand
OFC Women's Nations Cup: 2010, 2014, 2018

Individual
International
Nike Junior Women's Player of the Year 2006
Nike National Women's Player of the Year 2006, 2008, 2009, 2010, 2011
Oceania Football Confederation Women's Player of the Year 2009, 2010
FIFPRO World XI short-list (55 players): 2016, 2017
IFFHS OFC Woman Team of the Decade 2011–2020

Club
WPS Rookie of the Year: 2010
WPS All Pro selection (First XI): 2010, 2011
Damallsvenskan All Star Selection (First XI): 2013, 2014, 2015, 2016, 2017

College
All-Pac-10 freshman first team: 2006
TopDrawerSoccer.com Team of the Season: 2009
All-Pacific Region first team: 2009
All-Pac-10 first team: 2009
Pac-10 women's soccer Scholar-Athlete of the Year: 2009
Stanford University, Pat Strathairn Best Competitive Athlete Award: 2010

References

External links

 
 
 
  (archive)
 
 
 
 
 
 

1987 births
Living people
New Zealand women's association footballers
Olympic association footballers of New Zealand
Footballers at the 2008 Summer Olympics
Footballers at the 2012 Summer Olympics
Stanford Cardinal women's soccer players
FC Gold Pride players
Pali Blues players
Western New York Flash players
2007 FIFA Women's World Cup players
2011 FIFA Women's World Cup players
2015 FIFA Women's World Cup players
USL W-League (1995–2015) players
FC Rosengård players
Damallsvenskan players
Expatriate women's footballers in Sweden
New Zealand expatriate sportspeople in Sweden
New Zealand expatriate sportspeople in England
Chelsea F.C. Women players
Women's Super League players
Expatriate women's footballers in England
Soccer players from Los Angeles
Women's association football midfielders
Women's association football defenders
New Zealand women's international footballers
FIFA Century Club
Footballers at the 2016 Summer Olympics
American people of New Zealand descent
New Zealand people of American descent
New Zealand people of Chinese descent
American women's soccer players
Harvard-Westlake School alumni
2019 FIFA Women's World Cup players
FC Bayern Munich (women) players
New Zealand expatriate sportspeople in Germany
Frauen-Bundesliga players
Orlando Pride players
Angel City FC players
Footballers at the 2020 Summer Olympics
National Women's Soccer League players
Women's Professional Soccer players
New Zealand expatriate women's association footballers
New Zealand expatriate sportspeople in the United States
Expatriate women's soccer players in the United States
Expatriate women's footballers in Germany